Bash is a surname.

Persons
Baby Bash (born 1975), a Latin American hip-hop artist
Dana Bash (born 1971), CNN reporter and anchorwoman
Frankie Bash (born 1993), American musician
Jeremy Bash (born 1971), Chief of Staff to the United States Secretary of Defense
John Bash, American attorney
Mohamad Bash (born 1982), Syrian musician
Todd Bash (born 1965), American playwright
Zina Bash, American attorney

Also
Peter Bash, titular character in the American TV series Franklin & Bash
Bash, nickname of E. J. H. Nash (1898–1982), an influential evangelical clergyman

Surnames